Major General John Henry Hilldring (March 27, 1895 – January 20, 1974) was a senior United States Army officer who fought during both World War I and World War II and served as Assistant Secretary of State for Occupied Areas from 1946 to 1947.

Biography
Hilldring was born in New Rochelle, New York on March 27, 1895. He was of Swedish descent, and was educated at Columbia University before transferring to the University of Connecticut, graduating in 1918. He served in the United States Army during World War I, with the rank of first lieutenant, into the infantry. He saw action on the Western Front and was awarded the Distinguished Service Cross.

Hilldring went on to become a career officer in the Army. In this capacity, he was posted in the Philippines. In 1936, he was appointed to the General Staff of the United States Army.

With the American entry into World War II, Hilldring became Assistant Chief of Staff of the United States Army in 1942. With the rank of major general, he became the Commanding General (CG) of the 84th Infantry Division later in 1942. In 1943, he became the Chief of the Army's Civil Affairs Division.  In this capacity, he served as a U.S. delegate at the Potsdam Conference.  Hilldring retired from the Army in 1946.

On April 12, 1946, the President of the United States, Harry S. Truman, nominated Hilldring to be Assistant Secretary of State for Occupied Areas.  He was sworn in on April 17, 1946, and held office until August 31, 1947.

In 1950, Hilldring became foreign-operations manager of General Aniline & Film, a Swiss chemical firm that was seized by the U.S. during World War II on suspicion of Nazi domination.  He was promoted to executive vice president in 1954, and became the company's president in 1955.

Decorations

Works by John H. Hilldring
"What is Our Purpose in Germany?", The Annals of the American Academy of Political and Social Science (January 1948)
"The Common Market", The International Executive (Summer 1960)

References

External links
Generals of World War II

|-

1895 births
1974 deaths
United States Army Infantry Branch personnel
Military personnel from New Rochelle, New York
United States Assistant Secretaries of State
United States Army Command and General Staff College alumni
United States Army War College alumni
United States Army personnel of World War I
Recipients of the Distinguished Service Cross (United States)
Recipients of the Distinguished Service Medal (US Army)
Columbia College (New York) alumni
University of Connecticut alumni
United States Army generals of World War II
United States Army generals